The House Small Business Subcommittee on Economic Growth, Tax and Capital Access is one of five subcommittees of the House Small Business Committee and  is responsible for evaluating the operation of financial markets in the United States as well as their ability to provide small businesses with the capital they need. The subcommittee also reviews federal programs, but especially those that are being overseen by the Small Business Administration which is aimed at helping assist entrepreneurs in obtaining needed business capital. Since the tax policy also plays an integral role in access to capital, the committee also examines the impact of federal tax policies on small businesses.

Members, 117th Congress

Historical membership rosters

115th Congress

116th Congress

External links
House Committee on Small Business
Subcommittee on Economic Growth, Tax and Capital Access Subcommittee on Economic Growth, Tax and Capital Access

Small Business Economic Growth